The Y class are a class of diesel locomotives built by Clyde Engineering, Granville for the Victorian Railways between 1963 and 1968.

History

In 1963, the first of 25 general purpose diesel-electric locomotives was delivered by Clyde Engineering. As a cost saving measure, they were built with bogies and motors retrieved from scrapped Swing Door electric suburban train sets; the re-use of these components reduced the unit cost of the Y class locomotive from around £52,000 ($104,000) to £40,000 ($80,000). Two further orders saw the class total 75 by 1968.

Although built to dieselise Victoria's shunting operations and replace steam locomotives on branch line services, they were also used on mainline goods and passenger services, including between Spencer Street and Werribee.

After closure of branch lines across the state and the end of short pick-up goods trains, use of the class dropped.

In the 1980s, it is thought that four Y Class locomotives were on standard gauge, typically Nos 101–104.

Withdrawals commenced from 1985 and large-scale scrappings commenced during 1991 and 1992.

After the mass-withdrawals of the Y fleet up to 1992, engines 101, 102, 104, 150 and 151 were on standard gauge, as 103 had been withdrawn in the late 1980s. Y101 followed in the early '90s after suffering a collision, but it was not directly replaced.

From 1995, under the newly formed V/Line Freight division, engines Y115, Y151, Y152 and Y169 were running trains on standard gauge, and locomotives Y124 and Y142 were confined to shunting at South Dynon. Within a few years Y150 had replaced Y115 on standard gauge, with the latter engine shifting to Ballarat as a yard pilot. Around the same time, Y169 replaced Y102, and Y152 replaced Y104. These two engines were stored at Newport workshops, then transferred to South Dynon's "rotten row" where they sat for about a decade.

Only two engines—Y152 and Y165—were repainted into the V/Line Freight scheme, which was essentially the same as previous with a new decal and a lighter grey.

The 1999 sale of V/Line Freight to Freight Victoria included engines 110, 113, 115, 118–119, 121–122, 138, 150–152, 157, 165, 169, 171 and 174. Some of these were upgraded by 2002 using traction motors and gear sets cascaded from the Freight Australia A and X Class locomotive upgrades, permitting operation at 80 km/h. This required replacing the original plain whitemetal axle boxes; in the short term they were modified but eventually they were all replaced with custom units, obviating the need for fortnightly lubrication of the bearings. Air conditioning was also fitted.

Today, four are in service with V/Line as carriage yard shunters and fitted with low speed controls, with others owned by freight operator Pacific National. Seventeen units are officially preserved, though only a handful of those are operational.

Status table

References

Bo-Bo locomotives
Clyde Engineering locomotives
Pacific National diesel locomotives
Railway locomotives introduced in 1963
Y class
Broad gauge locomotives in Australia
Diesel-electric locomotives of Australia
Standard gauge locomotives of Australia